Billstedt is a major rapid transit station on the Hamburg U-Bahn lines U2 and U4. For line U2, Billstedt is a through station; for line U4, it is currently terminus station. Intermodal connections are available to local and regional buses. The station is located in the Hamburg district of Billstedt, Germany. Billstedt is part of the borough of Hamburg-Mitte.

History 
The station was opened in 1969, and initially served as terminus station for line U3 until opening of Merkenstraße station in May 1970.

Layout 
The station's layout is using a natural depression for the rail tracks to sit below street level, but nevertheless above ground level. The platforms for the U-Bahn trains are capped by the ZOB Billstedt, a central bus station. Adjacent to the bus station is Billstedt-Center, a  large shopping mall.

Service

Trains 
Billstedt U-Bahn station is served by Hamburg U-Bahn lines U2 and U4; departures into the inner-city are every 5 minutes; trains out east run every 10 minutes.

Bus 
Billstedt ZOB is served by ten HHA bus lines and a number of private bus operators.

Gallery

See also 
 List of Hamburg U-Bahn stations

References

External links 

 Line and route network plans by hvv.de 
 100 Jahre Hochbahn by hochbahn.de 

Hamburg U-Bahn stations in Hamburg
U2 (Hamburg U-Bahn) stations
U4 (Hamburg U-Bahn) stations
Buildings and structures in Hamburg-Mitte
Railway stations in Germany opened in 1969
1969 establishments in West Germany